The Swiss Open, is an annual badminton tournament held in Switzerland since 1955 and become one of the BWF Super Series tournament began 2007. In 2011 the tournament was dropped down to a Grand Prix Gold event.

Previous winners

Performances by nation

Note

References

External links 
Official website

 
Badminton tournaments in Switzerland
Recurring sporting events established in 1955
1955 establishments in Switzerland